Chelonodontops patoca, also known as the milk-spotted pufferfish, milkspotted puffer, milkspotted  toadfish, Gangetic blow fish, Gangetic pufferfish, or marbled toad, is a species of pufferfish in the family Tetraodontidae native to the Indo-Pacific. It ranges from East Africa to the Western Pacific from Korea in the north to northern Australia in the south. It is a tropical species that occurs in coastal waters, lagoons, estuaries, and rivers. While it does enter fresh water, the species does not occur more than a few kilometres from the sea. It is often seen in schools which sometimes enter freshwater streams. It is usually found at a depth range of 4 to 60 m (13 to 197 ft) and reaches  standard length. The species is poisonous but reportedly considered a delicacy in Japan.

References 

Tetraodontidae
Fish of the Indian Ocean
Fish of the Pacific Ocean
Freshwater fish of Africa
Freshwater fish of Asia
Freshwater fish of Oceania
Fish described in 1822
Taxa named by Francis Buchanan-Hamilton